Conseil de la concurrence is the name of several national competition regulators:
 Conseil de la concurrence, name of the former French competition regulator (now Autorité de la concurrence)
 Conseil de la concurrence (Belgium)
 Conseil de la concurrence (Luxembourg)